Kamil Majchrzak was the defending champion but chose not to defend his title.

Jack Draper won the title after defeating Zizou Bergs 6–2, 5–7, 6–4 in the final.

Seeds

Draw

Finals

Top half

Bottom half

References

External links
Main draw
Qualifying draw

Open Harmonie mutuelle - 1
2022 Singles